La Manga Pass, elevation , is a mountain pass in the San Juan Mountains of Colorado. The pass is situated in Rio Grande National Forest.

The pass, along with Cumbres Pass to the southwest, is traversed by State Highway 17. It is the only highway pass west out of the San Luis Valley between Wolf Creek Pass to the north and New Mexico. The pass is a watershed break between the Conejos River to the north, a tributary of the Rio Grande, and the Rio de los Pinos (Los Pinos River) to the south, which flows through Toltec Gorge and eventually joins the Conejos River via the Rio San Antonio.

References

Mountain passes of Colorado
Landforms of Conejos County, Colorado
San Juan Mountains (Colorado)